The Last Witness is a 1925 British silent crime film directed by Fred Paul and starring Paul, Isobel Elsom and Stella Arbenina. The screenplay concerns a barrister who prosecutes his own wife, who has recently had an affair with a Member of Parliament, for murder. It was based on a novel by F. Britten Austin.

Cast
 Fred Paul as Stephen Brand KC
 Isobel Elsom as Letitia Brand 
 Stella Arbenina as Mrs. Stapleton 
 Queenie Thomas as Lady Somerville 
 John F. Hamilton as Eric Norton 
 Tom Nesbitt as Maurice Tregarthen 
 Aubrey Fitzgerald as Lord Bunny Somerville

References

External links

1925 films
British silent feature films
1925 crime films
Films directed by Fred Paul
Films based on British novels
British crime films
Films set in London
Stoll Pictures films
Films shot at Cricklewood Studios
British black-and-white films
1920s English-language films
1920s British films